Dejan Mezga (born 16 July 1985) is a Croatian footballer who plays for Austrian amateur side SV Übelbach as a midfielder.

During his career, he played for Čakovec, Maribor, Hajduk Split, Apollon Limassol, Nacional, Inter Zaprešić, Varaždin, Polet Sv. Martin na Muri, and SV Übelbach.

Mezga acquired Slovenian citizenship on 23 August 2012.

Career
Coming from the village of Brezje, near Čakovec, in the region of Međimurje, Mezga went through the ranks of several lower-tier local clubs, debuting at the age of 15 for the seniors of NK Sloga Čakovec, before joining the U17 team of NK Varteks. In his last season of eligibility for the U19 team, he left the club, however, and joined the Druga HNL side NK Čakovec, where he became a fixture for the following several seasons.

In 2007, he joined the Slovenian PrvaLiga side Maribor. He soon established himself in the first team, and, after winning his first league title with the team, in 2009, won the fans' award "Vijoličasti bojevnik" (Purple Warrior) awarded to the most distinguished player of the past season. Maribor went on to win four titles in the following five seasons, with Mezga featuring heavily in all campaigns, and was selected for the league's ideal eleven of the 2011–12 championship.

After his contract expired in the summer of 2014, he joined Croatian side Hajduk Split.

He briefly returned to Maribor in August 2016, before signing for Nacional in January 2017.

References

External links
 
NZS profile 

1985 births
Living people
Sportspeople from Čakovec
Association football midfielders
Croatian footballers
NK Čakovec players
NK Maribor players
HNK Hajduk Split players
Apollon Limassol FC players
C.D. Nacional players
NK Inter Zaprešić players
NK Varaždin players
Slovenian PrvaLiga players
Croatian Football League players
Cypriot First Division players
Primeira Liga players
First Football League (Croatia) players
Second Football League (Croatia) players
Croatian expatriate footballers
Croatian expatriate sportspeople in Slovenia
Expatriate footballers in Slovenia
Croatian expatriate sportspeople in Cyprus
Expatriate footballers in Cyprus
Croatian expatriate sportspeople in Portugal
Expatriate footballers in Portugal
Croatian expatriate sportspeople in Austria
Expatriate footballers in Austria